Mitch North (born February 4, 1995) is an American soccer player who currently plays as a goalkeeper for USL League One club Central Valley Fuego.

Career

Youth & college
North was born in Medford, Oregon, but was raised in Jacksonville, Oregon. He attended both South Medford High School and Canby High School, and was a First Team All-State pick as a junior. In his senior year, he played with the Portland Timbers academy.

In 2013, North attended Oregon State University to play college soccer. He didn't play for the Beavers during 2013, redshirting the season. North transferred to Sonoma State University in 2014, where he went on to make 57 appearances for the Seawolves over four seasons and earned an honorable Mention All-CCAA in 2015. Again in 2016, North was a regular starter for Sonoma State, recording 66 saves, a career-high seven shutouts in 20 starts, and receiving another honorable mention recognition in the CCAA.

In 2017, North played in the USL PDL, making three appearances for Burlingame Dragons.

Professional
On February 23, 2021, North was announced as a new signing for NISA club California United Strikers. He went on to make ten regular season appearances for the Strikers.

On February 22, 2022, North signed with USL League One expansion club Central Valley Fuego FC ahead of their inaugural season. He made his debut for the club on April 5, 2022, appearing as an 83rd–minute substitute during a 4–1 win over USL Championship side El Paso Locomotive in a US Open Cup fixture.

References

1995 births
Living people
American soccer players
Association football goalkeepers
Burlingame Dragons FC players
California United Strikers FC players
Central Valley Fuego FC players
National Independent Soccer Association players
Oregon State Beavers men's soccer players
Sonoma State Seawolves men's soccer players
People from Ashland, Oregon
Soccer players from Oregon
USL League Two players